William Masao Kajikawa (September 6, 1912 – February 12, 2010) was an American football, basketball, and baseball coach.  He served as the head basketball coach at Arizona State University from 1949 to 1957, compiling a record of 88–131, and the school's head baseball coach from  1946 to 1952, tallying a mark of 57–70.  Kajikawa was also an assistant and freshmen football coach at Arizona State between 1937 and 1978.

Kajikawa attended Phoenix Union High School and played college football at Arizona State. During World War II Kajikawa was a member of the 442nd Regimental Combat Team.  Kajikawa died on February 12, 2010.

References

External links
 

1912 births
2010 deaths
American men's basketball coaches
American military personnel of Japanese descent
United States Army personnel of World War II
American sportspeople of Japanese descent
Arizona State Sun Devils baseball coaches
Arizona State Sun Devils football coaches
Arizona State Sun Devils football players
Arizona State Sun Devils men's basketball coaches
Basketball coaches from Arizona
Players of American football from Phoenix, Arizona
Sportspeople from Phoenix, Arizona
United States Army soldiers